Christos "Chris" Achilléos (1947 – 6 December 2021) was a Cypriot-born British painter and illustrator who specialised in fantasy artwork and glamour illustration.

Biography
Born in Famagusta, Cyprus, his family emigrated to the United Kingdom in 1959, where he resided.  He attended the Hornsey College of Art.

His work has appeared in Heavy Metal and Radio Times magazines, on book covers (including series based on the Conan the Barbarian character, TV's Doctor Who and Star Trek, as well as the Fighting Fantasy gamebook series), and in collections of his own work. He has also participated in various film projects including Heavy Metal and Willow as a conceptual artist, (his iconic poster image commissioned in 1980 featuring Taarna and her birdlike steed are still featured on the DVD release)  and created a proposed poster for Blade Runner.

Achilléos created the controversial cover for Whitesnake's 1979 album, Lovehunter, which showed a naked woman straddling a giant serpent. In an interview with MelodicRock, Gary Hughes stated that Achilléos thereafter "had a policy of not working with bands". The original artwork, along with several other pieces, were stolen from him in the 1980s and sold to a private collector. However, he designed an album cover and artwork in 2003 with Gary Hughes' rock opera Once and Future King Part I. His influence was also felt in the Kate Bush video for "Babooshka", in which the character's costume resembles the cover portrait he did of the heroine of the 1978 novel Raven - Swordsmistress of Chaos.

Following 1990, he mostly worked in designing fantasy trading cards as well as selling prints and original works of art.

Chris Achilléos died on 6 December 2021, at the age of 74.

Collections
Achilléos had published several book collections, including: 
 Beauty and the Beast (1978)
 Sirens (1986)
 Medusa (1988)
 Amazona (2004)

See also

 Concept art
 Fantastic art

References

External links
 
 
 
 Fansite for Achilléos art in use

1947 births
2021 deaths
20th-century British painters
British male painters
21st-century British painters
English people of Greek Cypriot descent
British illustrators
British speculative fiction artists
Cypriot emigrants to England
Fighting Fantasy
Fantasy artists
Games Workshop artists
Pin-up artists
Science fiction artists
People from Famagusta
20th-century British male artists
21st-century British male artists